Ardrossan railway station can refer to one of several railway stations in the town of Ardrossan, North Ayrshire, Scotland:

Ardrossan Harbour railway station
Ardrossan South Beach railway station
Ardrossan Town railway station
Ardrossan Montgomerie Pier railway station (closed)
Ardrossan North railway station (closed)
Ardrossan Winton Pier railway station (closed)

 Stations on navigable O.S. map.